Nigilgia aureoviridis is a moth in the family Brachodidae. It was described by Kallies in 1998. It is found on Sulawesi.

References

External Links 
Natural History Museum Lepidoptera generic names catalog

Brachodidae
Moths described in 1998